Theresa Conroy (born April 27, 1957) is an American politician who served in the Connecticut House of Representatives from the 105th district from 2009 to 2011 and from 2013 to 2017.

References

1957 births
Living people
Women state legislators in Connecticut
Democratic Party members of the Connecticut House of Representatives
21st-century American women politicians
21st-century American politicians
People from Seymour, Connecticut